Ingibjörg Sigurðardóttir (born 7 October 1997) is an Icelandic footballer who plays as a defender for Vålerenga in the Toppserien, the top-tier women's football league in Norway. A multi-sport athlete in her youth, she played in the Icelandic top-tier basketball league and for Iceland's junior national basketball teams before fully focusing on football.

Football

Club career
Ingibjörg grew up in Grindavík in southwest Iceland and joined the local club Grindavík at a young age. On August 17, 2011, at 13 years old, she debuted for Grindavík's senior in a match against Þróttur Reykjavík in the top-tier women's football league in Iceland. In 2012, at the age of 14 years, Ingibjörg signed with Breiðablik, the record champions in Icelandic women's football. In August 2012, she debuted for Breiðablik senior team. Until 2016, she played alternately with the youth and senior team, then exclusively for the senior team.

In December 2017, Ingibjörg signed with Djurgårdens IF of the Damallsvenskan.

National team career
At the age of 14, Ingibjörg was called for the Icelandic U-17 team, which participated in the qualifying tournament for the 2012 UEFA Women's Under-17 Championship. Her first game for the U17 team was on April 18, 2012, in Poperinge against Belgium. Ingibjörg also participated in the qualifying tournament for the 2014 UEFA Women's Under-17 Championship. In March 2014, Ingibjörg debuted for the Icelandic U-19 team in a match against Finland. Ingibjörg played her first international match for Iceland senior team on June 8, 2017, in a 0–0 away game against Ireland when she played 90 minutes. Shortly thereafter, Ingibjörg was included in the squad that represented Iceland at the UEFA Women's Euro 2017. She played against France and Switzerland in the Group Stage.

Basketball

Club career
Alongside football, Ingibjörg also played basketball for Grindavík basketball team. She first played for the senior team during the 2011-2012 season in the second-tier 1. deild kvenna. On 30 November 2011, she scored 30 points in a victory against Skallagrímur. The following season she appeared in three games in the top-tier Úrvalsdeild kvenna before fully focusing on football.

National team career
Ingibjörg played 12 games for the Icelandic U-16 team from 2011 to 2013.

Titles
1. deild kvenna: 2012

References

External links
 
 
 
 

1997 births
Living people
Ingibjorg Sigurdardottir
Damallsvenskan players
Djurgårdens IF Fotboll (women) players
Ingibjorg Sigurdardottir
Ingibjorg Sigurdardottir
Ingibjorg Sigurdardottir
Ingibjorg Sigurdardottir
Ingibjorg Sigurdardottir
Ingibjorg Sigurdardottir
Ingibjorg Sigurdardottir
Ingibjorg Sigurdardottir
Ingibjorg Sigurdardottir
Toppserien players
Ingibjorg Sigurdardottir
Ingibjorg Sigurdardottir
Vålerenga Fotball Damer players
Women's association football defenders
UEFA Women's Euro 2022 players
UEFA Women's Euro 2017 players